Lake Tåkern is a lake in Östergötland County, Sweden. It is considered one of northern Europe's foremost bird lakes. The whole lake, with the surrounding beaches, has been a nature reserve since 1975. From April to the end of July, it is not open to the public, except for visiting areas and walking routes.

The lake's history as a birdlake is related to the lake's water level lowering between 1842 and 1844. A number of bird species benefited from this. A change of the water level in the 1960s was made to prevent large differences in the water level.

Tåkern is in Ramsar Convention, an international convention for protection of valuable wetlands.

See also
 Nearby lakes: Lake Vättern, Lake Vänern, Lake Boren, Lake Roxen.
 Nearby churches: Kumla Church, Östergötland
 Nearby sights: The Rök runestone, The Alvastra pile-dwelling

References

External links
Tåkerns fältstation (Swedish)
Naturus-Tåkerns trädgård (Swedish)

Lakes of Östergötland County
Ramsar sites in Sweden
Nature reserves in Sweden
Tourist attractions in Östergötland County